William Russell Todd (May 1, 1928 – February 12, 2023) was a United States Army major general who served as commander of the 1st Cavalry Division from 1976 to 1978.  He graduated from Norwich University in 1950, and was the university's president from 1982 to 1992.

Biography
Todd was born in Seattle, Washington, on May 1, 1928. He graduated from Norwich University in 1950, and received his commission as a second lieutenant of cavalry in the United States Army. He led an Armor platoon in Korea during the Korean War.

In 1964, Todd received a master of business administration degree from the University of Alabama.  He subsequently commanded 1st Battalion, 63rd Armor Regiment, after which he attended the Naval War College. After graduating, he commanded 3rd Brigade, 25th Infantry Division in Vietnam during the Vietnam War.

From November 1976 to November 1978, Todd was commander of the 1st Cavalry Division.

In 1982, Todd was appointed president of Norwich University. He remained in this position until retiring in 1992.

Todd died on February 12, 2023, at the age of 94.

References

1928 births
2023 deaths
United States Army generals
Norwich University alumni
University of Alabama alumni
Naval War College alumni
Presidents of Norwich University
United States Army personnel of the Korean War
United States Army personnel of the Vietnam War
Military personnel from Seattle
Recipients of the Silver Star